Heliophanillus is a genus of the spider family Salticidae (jumping spiders).

H. lucipeta was synonymized with H. fulgens in 2007.

Species
As of May 2017, the World Spider Catalog lists the following species in the genus:
 Heliophanillus conspiciendus Wesołowska & van Harten, 2010 – United Arab Emirates
 Heliophanillus fulgens (O. P.-Cambridge, 1872) –  Greece to Central Asia
 Heliophanillus metallifer Wesołowska & van Harten, 2010 – United Arab Emirates
 Heliophanillus suedicola (Simon, 1901) –  Yemen, Socotra

References

Salticidae
Spiders of Asia
Salticidae genera